Lost Dogs is a two-disc compilation album by the American alternative rock band Pearl Jam, released on November 11, 2003 through Epic Records. The album has been certified gold by the RIAA in the United States.

Overview
Lost Dogs is a double-disc collection of B-sides and other released and unreleased rarities. Lost Dogs sold 89,500 copies in its first week of release and debuted at number fifteen on the Billboard 200 chart. Lost Dogs has been certified gold by the RIAA.

A number of songs included on Lost Dogs differ from the originally released versions, including "Alone", "U", "Wash" and "Dirty Frank". The album includes the hidden track "4/20/02" at the end of disc two, a tribute to Alice in Chains frontman Layne Staley. It was written by vocalist Eddie Vedder during the recording sessions for Riot Act on the day that he heard the news of Staley's death. The song features only Vedder singing and playing the guitar in a ukulele-inspired tuning. According to Vedder, the reason why it was not included on Riot Act was that the band already had too many songs. According to guitarist Mike McCready, the reason the song was only featured as a hidden track on Lost Dogs is because Vedder "wouldn't want it to be exploitative".

"Angel" (from the 1993 fan club Christmas single) was supposed to appear on disc two, but was deleted before release. There is still mention of it on the "lost dogs" flyers on the back cover. Besides "Angel", some notable omissions from the album include various songs only available on other fan club Christmas singles by the band, "I Got Id" and "Long Road" from the Merkin Ball EP, and "Leatherman" from the "Given to Fly" single.

The song "Bee Girl" is a tribute to Heather DeLoach, who appeared in a bee costume in the music video for "No Rain" by Blind Melon.

Reception

Lost Dogs was generally well-received by music critics upon its initial release. AllMusic staff writer Stephen Thomas Erlewine gave the album four and a half out of five stars. He said, "This is further proof that Pearl Jam consciously turned away from the big, anthemic sound and spirit that won them a mass audience with Ten—they still had the songs and sound, they just chose to bury it. Lost Dogs crackles with that passion and it has another advantage: unlike most of Pearl Jam's albums, it's a fun, compulsive listen. More than any other album in its catalog, Lost Dogs captures what Pearl Jam stood for and what it felt like at their peak."

Rolling Stone staff writer David Fricke gave the album three out of five stars, saying that "for an album of odds 'n' sods, Lost Dogs sure sounds a lot like a pack of hits." In a review for Spin, music critic Will Hermes compared it to other compilations by claiming that "Unlike most collections of its kind, Dogs seems motivated more by good sense than greed; even the song about saving the whales is kinda kicky."

Track listing

Disc one
"All Night" (Jeff Ament, Stone Gossard, Jack Irons, Mike McCready, Eddie Vedder) – 3:22
Previously unreleased. No Code outtake.
"Sad" (Vedder) – 3:39
Previously unreleased. Binaural outtake. Originally titled "Letter to the Dead".
"Down" (Gossard, McCready, Vedder) – 3:15
Originally from the "I Am Mine" single.
"Hitchhiker" (Vedder) – 3:17
Previously unreleased. Binaural outtake.
"Don't Gimme No Lip" (Gossard) – 2:35
Previously unreleased. No Code outtake.
"Alone" (Dave Abbruzzese, Ament, Gossard, McCready, Vedder) – 3:11
Originally from the "Go" single. This version has new vocals and slightly different lyrics and is shorter than the B-side version. The music from this version is from the Ten sessions. Drummer Dave Abbruzzese gets writing credit for this because it wasn't published until 1993 (when all members were getting equal credit), even though it was written a year before he joined the band.
"In the Moonlight" (Matt Cameron) – 3:07
Previously unreleased. Binaural outtake.
"Education" (Vedder) – 2:46
Previously unreleased. Binaural outtake.
"Black, Red, Yellow" (Vedder) – 3:26
Originally from the "Hail, Hail" single. This version is longer than the B-side version.
"U" (Vedder) – 2:53
Originally from the "Wishlist" single. A reworking of the 1997 B-side version.
"Leaving Here" (Brian Holland, Lamont Dozier, Edward Holland Jr.) – 2:51
Originally from the Home Alive: The Art of Self Defense compilation.
"Gremmie Out of Control" (Jimmy Haskell) – 2:25
Originally from the Music for Our Mother Ocean Vol. 1 compilation.
"Whale Song" (Irons) – 3:35
Originally from the Music for Our Mother Ocean Vol. 3 compilation.
"Undone" (Vedder) – 3:10
Originally from the "I Am Mine" single.
"Hold On" (Gossard, Vedder) – 4:22
Previously unreleased. Ten outtake. The booklet incorrectly lists this as a Vs. outtake.
"Yellow Ledbetter" (Ament, McCready, Vedder) – 5:00
Originally from the "Jeremy" single. The song became a radio hit in 1994. The last note cuts off on this version.

Disc two
"Fatal" (Gossard) – 3:39
Previously unreleased. Binaural outtake.
"Other Side" (Ament) – 4:04
Originally from the "Save You" single.
"Hard to Imagine" (Gossard, Vedder) – 4:35
Originally from the Chicago Cab soundtrack. This version has a different vocal recording and mix than the soundtrack version, featuring alternate lyrics. The booklet lists this as a Vs. outtake, although it had been reported to be from the Vitalogy sessions.
"Footsteps" (Gossard, Vedder) – 3:54
Originally from the "Jeremy" single. Recorded live during Pearl Jam's appearance on Rockline on May 11, 1992. The harmonica was not present on the B-side version. The song's music, with different lyrics, also appeared on Temple of the Dog's self-titled LP under the name "Times of Trouble".
"Wash" (Ament, Gossard, Dave Krusen, McCready, Vedder) – 3:48
Originally from the "Alive" single. It also appeared as an extra track on European releases of Ten. This version is a different one than the B-side version.
"Dead Man" (Vedder) – 4:16
Originally from the "Off He Goes" single. Originally intended for the Dead Man Walking soundtrack, but passed over in favor of Bruce Springsteen's "Dead Man Walkin'".
"Strangest Tribe" (Gossard) – 3:49
Originally from the 1999 fan club Christmas single.
"Drifting" (Vedder) – 2:53
Originally from the 1999 fan club Christmas single. This version has a different vocal recording than the fan club Christmas single version, sung an octave higher.
"Let Me Sleep" (McCready, Vedder) – 2:59
Originally from the 1991 fan club Christmas single.
"Last Kiss" (Wayne Cochran) – 3:17
Originally from the 1998 fan club Christmas single. It was released to the public as a single in 1999. It reached number 2 on the Billboard Hot 100, giving Pearl Jam its biggest hit to date.
"Sweet Lew" (Ament) – 2:11
Previously unreleased. Binaural outtake.
"Dirty Frank" (Abbruzzese, Ament, Gossard, McCready, Vedder) – 5:42
Originally from the "Even Flow" single. It also appeared as an extra track on European releases of Ten. This version is slightly longer than the B-side version and features quite a bit of the lyrics removed.
"Brother" (Gossard) – 3:47
Previously unreleased. Ten outtake. All vocals were removed from the original outtake version, making this version of the song an instrumental. McCready recorded a new lead guitar part for this version. Another version of "Brother" with vocals appears on the 2009 Ten reissue and became a radio hit that same year.
"Bee Girl" (Ament, Vedder) – 9:55
Previously unreleased. Recorded live during Pearl Jam's appearance on Rockline on October 18, 1993.
"Bee Girl" contains the hidden track "4/20/02" at 6:04, roughly four minutes and twenty seconds after "Bee Girl". "4/20/02", a Riot Act outtake, is a song honoring Layne Staley of Alice in Chains. 4/20/02 is the date Vedder heard of Staley's passing. Staley had died earlier on 4/05/02, but was not discovered until 4/19/02.

Personnel

Pearl Jam
Dave Abbruzzese – drums
Jeff Ament – bass guitar, guitar, vocals, cover concept, cover/back photos
Matt Cameron – drums, percussion, guitar
Stone Gossard – guitar, vocals, bass guitar, percussion, production
Jack Irons – drums, guitar, vocals, percussion
Dave Krusen – drums, slit drum
Mike McCready – guitar, piano
Eddie Vedder – guitar, vocals, E-Bow, harmonica, production, additional Polaroid photography

Additional musicians and production
Matt Bayles – mixing, engineering
Tchad Blake – production, mixing, engineering, Wurlitzer
Ed Brooks – mixing, engineering
Nick DiDia – engineering
Brett Eliason – mixing, engineering
Mitchell Froom – keys
Adam Kasper – production, mixing, engineering
Brad Klausen – layout and design
Brendan O'Brien – production, mixing, guitar
Rick Parashar – production, mixing, engineering
Pearl Jam – production
Westwood One Broadcast – production

Charts

Certifications

References

External links
Lost Dogs information and lyrics at pearljam.com

2003 compilation albums
Pearl Jam compilation albums
B-side compilation albums
Epic Records compilation albums
Albums produced by Brendan O'Brien (record producer)
Albums produced by Rick Parashar
Albums produced by Tchad Blake
Albums produced by Stone Gossard
Albums produced by Adam Kasper
Albums produced by Eddie Vedder
Albums produced by Jeff Ament
Albums produced by Mike McCready
Albums produced by Matt Cameron
Albums produced by Jack Irons
Albums produced by Dave Krusen
Albums produced by Dave Abbruzzese